Leslie Elizabeth Bullock Andrews (February 12, 1911 – December 2, 2002) was the first woman to represent Alabama in the United States House of Representatives. She was the wife of congressman George William Andrews, and was appointed to his seat after his death.

Biography
Born Leslie Elizabeth Bullock in Geneva, Alabama to Charles Gillespie Bullock and Janie Aycock, Andrews attended Geneva public schools. She earned a B.S. in home economics from Montevallo College (now the University of Montevallo), Montevallo, Alabama, in 1932. She went on to become a high school teacher at Livingston, Alabama. She later took a teaching job in Union Springs for the better pay during the Depression. This is where she met her husband, George William Andrews. They married on November 25, 1936 and had two children, Jane and George, Jr. The marriage lasted more than 35 years until his death of complications from heart surgery on December 25, 1971.

Career
When her husband first ran for the 78th Congress, she was heavily involved with his campaign. He was reelected to 14 succeeding Congresses and the couple relocated to Washington, DC where Andrews became involved in the Congressional Club and served as vice president in 1971.

After her husband's death in 1971, she was greatly encouraged by Lera Thomas and other friends to run for George's office as she could carry on his legacy. Andrews announced her candidacy on January 1, 1972 and received the endorsement of Alabama Governor George Wallace. Running unopposed, she was elected as a Democrat by special election to the Ninety-second Congress to fill the vacancy caused by the death of her husband, United States Representative George W. Andrews. She served the remainder of that Congress from April 4, 1972 to January 3, 1973. She was not a candidate for reelection to the Ninety-third Congress in 1972. She remained the only woman elected to represent Alabama in either House of Congress until the elections of Representatives Martha Roby and Terri Sewell in 2010.

During her term on the 92nd Congress, she was on the Committee on Post Office and Civil Service where she introduced amendments to protect medical and Social Security benefits. She also worked to find funding for Birmingham research centers researching cancer and heart disease. She supported the Nixon administration's plan for withdrawing U.S. troops from Vietnam. Andrews also worked to sponsor legislation to designate Tuskegee University as a National Historic Site.

She left Congress in January 1973 and she moved to Union Springs where she was active in civic affairs.

Death
Andrews died on December 2, 2002 at the age of 91 in Birmingham, Alabama. She is interred at Oak Hill Cemetery, Union Springs, Alabama.

See also
 Women in the United States House of Representatives

References

External links

Elizabeth Bullock Andrews entry at The Political Graveyard

1911 births
2002 deaths
Schoolteachers from Alabama
20th-century American women educators
Female members of the United States House of Representatives
People from Geneva County, Alabama
Women in Alabama politics
Democratic Party members of the United States House of Representatives from Alabama
20th-century American politicians
20th-century American women politicians
20th-century American educators